Sings the Country Music Hall of Fame Hits, Vol. 1 is the 10th album by Jerry Lee Lewis released on Smash Records in 1969.

Background
After his resurgence on the country charts, Lewis and producer Jerry Kennedy opted to record two albums worth of classic country songs in four sessions spread over two days as a way to fulfill his obligation to his record label, Smash, for 1969. As country music historian Colin Escott notes in his essay for the 1986 retrospective The Killer: The Smash/Mercury Years, "Not only did this avoid the problem of screening new material but it also gained Jerry some instant credibility in his new found quest to be viewed as a country artist." The album includes country standards such as "Sweet Dreams", made famous by Patsy Cline, and the classic Hank Williams lament "I'm So Lonesome I Could Cry". The duet "Jackson" features Linda Gail Lewis. Critics have often cited the rushed nature of the sessions as a reason for the album's uniform feel when compared to Lewis's previous albums Another Place, Another Time and She Still Comes Around, but in truth the tight schedule likely had little impact since Lewis would usually record no more than two takes of a song if he could get away with it. The album soared to number 2 on the Billboard country albums chart.

It was during this period that Lewis appeared at the Toronto Peace Festival in front of twenty thousand people, sharing the bill with John Lennon and Alice Cooper as well as fellow rock and roll icons Chuck Berry, Bo Diddley, and Little Richard. Lewis also appeared in a television special called The Many Sounds of Jerry Lee, which showcased "the Killer" performing an array of diverse music.

Track listing

1969 albums
Jerry Lee Lewis albums
Albums produced by Jerry Kennedy
Smash Records albums